

The Belledune Generating Station is a 450 MW coal-fired electrical generating station located in the community of Belledune in Gloucester County, New Brunswick.  It is a thermal generating station owned and operated by provincial Crown corporation NB Power.

Construction of the plant began in 1991 and it began generating electricity in 1993.  At 450 MW, it is designed to burn coal which is delivered by ship through the Port of Belledune and occasionally by rail or truck.  Coal is mostly sourced in the United States and South America but local sources mined at Minto, NB and Sydney, NS have been used on occasion.

The Belledune plant is attractive for shipping as it is situated on the shore of Chaleur Bay adjacent to a ship-unloading pier; Terminal II at the Port of Belledune was built in 1991-1992 by the Canada Ports Corporation as part of the Belledune Generating Station project.  Terminal II has a 307 metre long wharf with a 28 metre wide apron and depth alongside of 15.9 metres, thus capable of handling up to Capesize vessels of 100,000 DWT.  An automated coal continuous ship unloader moves coal at 1750 metric tonnes per hour to stockpiles adjacent to the plant.

This reservoir is visible from New Brunswick Route 11 which was built on a new right of way that crosses the southern part of this reservoir, opening in the early 1990s. The construction of the Belledune Generating Station also resulted in the realignment of a  section of local road New Brunswick Route 134.

The plant itself features a single boiler and a single 169 meter (554 ft) tall smokestack.  The plant was the first in Canada to install scrubbers to help reduce sulphur dioxide emissions; it also has an electrostatic precipitator that removes over 99% of particles in the flue gases, as well as special burners to limit nitrogen oxide emissions.  The plant was designed to accommodate construction of a parallel second generating station (phase II) should one be built.  An upgrade began in July 2004 which saw a Titan ProAsh facility built to recapture 75% of fly ash produced by the generating station.  This has resulted in production of a synthetic gypsum byproduct which is sold by NB Power to J.D. Irving Limited for production into wallboard.

The plant consumes approximately 1 million tons of coal per year, and currently generates approximately fifteen percent of the province's electricity, while producing roughly thirty percent of the province's air pollution and greenhouse gas emissions (among large industrial polluters).

In October 2009 the provincial government announced that it had reached an agreement with Hydro Quebec to sell NB Power to that company (see Proposed sale of NB Power).  The sale was not completed, however, the initial memorandum of understanding would have seen NB Power transfer all of its generating assets except for the thermal stations at Dalhousie, Belledune and Coleson Cove.

The sale of NB Power to Hydro Quebec was canceled in spring 2010, presumably sparing the Belledune Generating Station from any major changes to its operation.

The future of the coal power plant is a topic of ongoing controversy. Canada has committed to phasing out the use of coal for electricity by 2030 to reduce greenhouse gas emissions as part of its Nationally Determined Contribution to the Paris Agreement, and the Pan-Canadian Framework on Clean Growth and Climate Change. However, New Brunswick energy minister Mike Holland (politician) has argued for its continued operation through 2040, but only in the winter months. There have been proposals to replace its electricity generation with small modular reactors and with Hydroelectricity from Hydro-Québec.

See also

 List of largest power stations in Canada
 List of tallest structures in Canada

References

Buildings and structures in Gloucester County, New Brunswick
Coal-fired power stations in New Brunswick
NB Power
1993 establishments in New Brunswick
Energy infrastructure completed in 1993